Harold Andrew Mason (30 July 1911 – 25 November 1993) was a lecturer of English at Exeter University.

He was born in Hull, England in 1911. He was educated at Hull Grammar School, Christ's Hospital, Hull University College and Oriel College, Oxford. He graduated from Oxford in 1934. He became a teacher of Classics at Stamford School.

In 1937, Mason began teaching Classics at a school in Switzerland and also started contributing to Scrutiny. He got married in 1945. In 1949, he was Assistant Director of Studies in English at Downing College, Cambridge. He was an editor of Scrutiny from 1949 until it ceased publication in 1953. From 1955-65 he was a lecturer at Exeter University.

Mason was elected to F. R. Leavis Lectureship and a Fellow of Clare Hall in 1965. In 1966 he founded The Cambridge Quarterly, of which he was the editor.

Mason died in Cambridge in 1993.

References 

1911 births
1993 deaths
Academics of the University of Exeter
Alumni of Oriel College, Oxford
People educated at Christ's Hospital